Van Bergen is a Dutch toponymic surname meaning "from/of Bergen". Most commonly this refers to Bergen in Dutch Limburg, Bergen op Zoom, Bergen in North Holland, or Mons in Hainaut (known as Bergen in Dutch). Notable people with the surname include:

Adriaen van Bergen (fl. 1590), Dutch participant of the Eighty Years' War
Anthony Van Bergen (colonel) (1729–1792), American soldier 
Anthony Van Bergen (1786–1859), American politician and judge 
Anthony T. Van Bergen (1827–1912), American businessman 
 (1964–1990), German actress, daughter of Ingrid van Bergen
Cornelis van Bergen (1458-1509), Dutch admiral
Dirck van Bergen (1645–1700), Dutch landscape painter
Harry Van Bergen (1871–1963), American competitive sailor
Ingrid van Bergen (born 1931), German actress
John S. Van Bergen (1885–1969), American architect
Julia van Bergen (born 1999), Dutch singer
Lewis Van Bergen (born 1938), American actor
Mitchell van Bergen (born 1999), Dutch football forward
Peter A. Van Bergen (1763–1804), American politician and judge
Ryan Van Bergen (born 1989), American football player
Tjapko van Bergen (1903–1944), Dutch rower
Willem van Bergen (1551–1609), Flemish noble and bishop of Antwerp

Van Glymes van Bergen
Anton van Glymes van Bergen (1500–1541), First Margrave of Bergen op Zoom
Cornelis van Glymes van Bergen (1490?–c.1560), Prince-bishop of Liège 1538–1544
Jan III van Glymes van Bergen (1452–1532), Lord of Bergen op Zoom
Jan IV van Glymes van Bergen (1528–1567), Second Margrave of Bergen op Zoom
Robert van Glymes van Bergen  (c. 1520–1565), Prince-bishop of Liège 1557–1563

See also
Van Bergen House, historic house in Greene County, New York
Van Bergen's Regiment of Militia, New York militia led by Antony Van Bergen

References

Dutch-language surnames
Surnames of Dutch origin
Toponymic surnames